Herpetogramma holophaea is a moth in the family Crambidae. It was described by George Hampson in 1899. It is found in Australia, where it has been recorded from Queensland.

References

Moths described in 1899
Herpetogramma
Moths of Australia